Restrung is an American-Canadian independent documentary film directed, shot, and edited by Mike Enns and produced by Enns and Randy Fullmer. The film made its world premiere on July 1, 2014.

Synopsis
The film chronicles Fullmer's life and career from making guitars at a young age, to work on Disney animated films such as The Emperor's New Groove, Who Framed Roger Rabbit, and The Lion King, to ultimately resigning from the company and establishing a guitar-making business.

Cast
 Randy Fullmer
 Abraham Laboriel
 James Lomenzo
 Pikfull
 Pennal Johnson
 Fernando Vallin

Award
 RGB Emerging Artists Award - Niagaria Integrated Film Festival

References

External links
 Official website
 Restrung at Internet Movie Database

2014 documentary films
American documentary films
Canadian documentary films
Documentary films about music and musicians
2010s English-language films
2010s American films
2010s Canadian films